Jeff, Jeffrey, Geoff, or Geoffrey MacDonald may refer to:

 Geoff Macdonald (born 1958), American tennis coach
 Jeff MacDonald, writer of Capitalist Piglet
 Jeff MacDonald (curler), in the 2012 Courtesy Freight Northern Ontario Superspiel
 Jeffrey R. MacDonald (born 1943), American convicted for the murders of his pregnant wife and two daughters

See also 

 Geoff McDonald (disambiguation)
 Jeff McDonald (disambiguation)